The 2000 season was the Denver Broncos' 31st in the National Football League (NFL) and their 41st overall. It also was the team's final year at the famous Mile High Stadium.

The Broncos rebounded from their previous output, winning 11 games and finished 2nd in the AFC West. Denver's season ended with a 21–3 defeat to the Baltimore Ravens in the Wildcard round. The Ravens won the Super Bowl that year.

With running back Terrell Davis still struggling with injuries, Denver turned to rookie Mike Anderson, who had a successful rookie campaign and was named Offensive Rookie of the Year following the season.

Offseason

NFL draft

Draft notes

Staff

Roster

Regular season

Schedule

Standings

Postseason

Awards and records 
Mike Anderson, franchise record, most rushing yards in one game, 251 yards (December 3, 2000) 
Mike Anderson, NFL record, most rushing yards in one game for a rookie, 251 yards (December 3, 2000) 
Gus Frerotte, franchise record, most passing yards in one game, 462 yards (November 19, 2000) 
Ed McCaffrey, franchise record, most receptions in one season, 101 receptions 
Trevor Pryce, AFC Pro Bowl selection,
Rod Smith, AFC Pro Bowl selection,
Rod Smith, franchise record, most receiving yards in one season, 1,602 receiving yards-

Milestones 
QB Brian Griese named to the Pro Bowl.

References 

 Denver Broncos – 2000 media guide
 Broncos on Pro Football Reference
 Broncos Schedule on jt-sw.com

Denver Broncos
Denver Broncos seasons
Denver Broncos